Herthasee may refer to:

 Herthasee (Berlin), a lake in Germany
 Herthasee (Rügen), a lake in Germany
 Herthasee (Holzappel), a lake in Germany
 Herthasee (Hörstel), a lake in Germany